Alakbar Rezaguliyev (31 January 1903 in Baku, Baku Governorate – 31 January 1974 in Baku) (alternative spelling: Alekper Rzaguliyev) was an Azerbaijani artist. He was awarded the title Honored Artist of the Azerbaijan SSR (1964).

Early life
Alakbar was born in Baku, into the large family of a small businessman-shopkeeper. Although there were no artists in his family, Rezaguliyev showed artistic talent at an early age. He studied at Moscow Technical Art College from 1925 to 1928. After graduation, he returned to Baku.

Years in exile
Alakbar was among the first to be arrested in what would later be termed as Stalin's Repression, in which 70,000 Azerbaijanis were executed or exiled along with hundreds of thousands of other citizens throughout the USSR. His friend was accused of advocating "pan-Turkish ideas," and Alakbar was deemed guilty by mere association. When Alakbar was thrown into prison, he didn't even know what he was being accused of or why. Altogether, Alakbar spent more than 23 years of his life in exile.
He was sentenced to six years. After being released, he returned and married Sona Huseynova in 1935; the couple had two daughters, Adila and Sevil. He and Sona later divorced.

On November 3, 1937, again Alakbar was arrested. He told his fellow artist Rasim Babayev how it happened: "One day I was walking down Komsomolskaya Street when I ran into Ruhulla Akhundov (one of the Bolsheviks who helped establish the Soviet system in Azerbaijan). "Ruhulla looked annoyed at seeing me and remarked rudely: 'Hey, you dumb guy, are you back here again?' And with those words, I was sent directly back to prison" - this time, to Siberia and later on to Solovki, an island in the Arctic where there are monasteries. Alakbar would go on to do a series of paintings depicting the isolation of those years there.

During his exile, Alakbar married a German girl named Berta, who had been sent to Siberia from a German settlement in the Saratov Autonomous Region. When World War II broke out, Joseph Stalin had exiled all Germans living in the Soviet Union. Alakbar and Berta had two sons, Ogtay and Aydin, and a daughter, Sevda.

After Exile

After Stalin died in 1953, tens of thousands of prisoners were released from prison. Alakbar, too, was among those who eventually were able to return to Azerbaijan. The exile greatly affected his personality. He became very serious and morally broken. It even affected his creative activity. He very seldom used colors after returning home. The harsh experiences of imprisonment that he had suffered for more than two decades, after all, had been his fate merely through association and not based on any crime that he had ever committed himself.

References

External links
To view works of Rezaguliyev, visit AZgallery.org

Soviet painters
1974 deaths
1903 births
Artists from Baku
20th-century Azerbaijani painters